Charles Robinson (November 4, 1835 – October 17, 1898) was an Ontario physician and political figure. He represented Cardwell in the Legislative Assembly of Ontario from 1879 to 1883 as a Liberal member.

He was born in Chinguacousy Township, York County, Upper Canada in 1835. His father was of English descent and his mother was Scottish. Robinson studied at the Toronto School of Medicine and the Jefferson Medical College. He set up practice in Claude in Peel County. In 1869, he married Helen Standing. Robinson served eight years as coroner.

External links 
The Canadian parliamentary companion and annual register, 1881, CH Mackintosh

1835 births
1898 deaths
Canadian coroners
Physicians from Ontario
Ontario Liberal Party MPPs
People from Caledon, Ontario